Arthur Emlyn Thomas (7 May 1895 – 11 February 1953) was a Welsh cricketer.  Thomas was a right-handed batsman.  He was born at Briton Ferry, Glamorgan.

Thomas made his debut for Glamorgan in the 1913 Minor Counties Championship against the Surrey Second XI, in what was his only Minor Counties appearance for the county.  By 1925, Glamorgan were a first-class county.  Thomas made his only first-class appearance for Glamorgan in the 1925 County Championship against Northamptonshire at St. Helen's, Swansea.  In the match he scored 15 runs, leaving him with a batting average of 7.50 and a top score of 11.

Thomas died at the town of his birth on 11 February 1953.

References

External links
Arthur Thomas at Cricinfo
Arthur Thomas at CricketArchive

1895 births
1953 deaths
Cricketers from Briton Ferry
Welsh cricketers
Glamorgan cricketers